Sri Venkateswara University Ground is a multi-purpose stadium  located in Tirupati, Andhra Pradesh. The stadium has facilities for cricket, hockey, football, basketball, and lawn tennis, as well as a 400-meter track, a pavilion, and galleries. The ground has hosted Ranji matches in 1984 and 1992. Karnataka cricket team and Andhra cricket team playing in the first match where Karnataka won by 141 runs. In second match also Andhra losses to Tamil by an innings and 166 runs. International cricketer like VB Chandrasekhar, Woorkeri Raman, Robin Singh, Roger Binny, Sadanand Viswanath, Gundappa Viswanath, Brijesh Patel played on this ground.

it is also called as Taraka Rama stadium name of former chief minister of Andhra Pradesh Nandamoori Taraka Rama Rao

References

External links
 Cricinfo
 cricketarchive

Cricket grounds in Andhra Pradesh
Football venues in Andhra Pradesh
Indoor arenas in India
University sports venues in India
Basketball venues in India
Volleyball venues in India
Buildings and structures in Tirupati
1984 establishments in Andhra Pradesh
Sports venues completed in 1984
20th-century architecture in India